Cameron Rhodes (born 1 August 1967) is a New Zealand film and theatrical actor and director.

Life and career
Rhodes graduated from Toi Whakaari: New Zealand Drama School in 1987 with a Diploma in Acting. He has appeared in various TV shows (including Xena: Warrior Princess) and films including The Royal Treatment, The Lord of the Rings, Mr. Pip, and Housebound.

Rhodes has appeared in over 95 theatre productions in New Zealand and Australia, playing roles including Cyrano in Cyrano De Bergerac, Orgon in Tartuffe, a Silo Theatre production in 2011 and Truscott in Loot. 

He appeared as Garfield Todd in Black Lover by Stanley Makuwe produced by The Auckland Theatre Company and first presented at the Auckland Festival in 2020. Television work includes The Luminaries for BBC1, The New Legends of Monkey on Netflix, and Rake for ABC Australia. He plays Gavin Walters in the mockumentary web-series Colour Blind by Australian actor Tai Hara about casting agents.

As a director Rhodes in 2014 co-directed with Ian Mune Once On Chanuk Bair by Maurice Shadbolt for Auckland Theatre Company.

Stage and screen roles

 Theatre 
Selected theatre productions include:

 Agamemnon by Aeschylus translated and directed by Tolis Papazaglou and Phillip Mann, Downstage Theatre (1997) - actorSweeny Todd director Colin McColl, Downstage Theatre (1999) - actor (Beadle Bamford)
 The Duchess of Malfi by John Webster, director Colin McColl, Auckland Theatre Company - actor (The Cardinal)
 Tartuffe by Molière director Shane Bosher, Silo Theatre production (2011) - actor (Orgon)
 Live Live Cinema: Dementia 13 and Carnival of Souls creator and composer Leon Radojkovic, director Oliver Driver (2013) - actor
 Ropable by Ross Gumbley and Allison Horsley, director Ross Gumbley, Court Theatre (2017) - actor

 Black Lover by Stanley Makuwe, director Roy Ward (2020) - actor (Garfield Todd) 

Film
 Absent Without Leave (1992) – Ted
 Bread and Roses (1994) – Pacifist Friend #2
 The Lord of the Rings: The Fellowship of the Ring (2001) – Farmer Maggot
 The Chronicles of Narnia: The Lion, the Witch and the Wardrobe (2005) – Gryphon (voice)
 The Devil Dared Me To (2007) – Butler
 We're Here to Help (2007) – Simon Carr
 Second Hand Wedding (2008) – Red Haired Man
 Jinxed Sister (2008) – Laura's Father
 I'm Not Harry Jenson (2009) – Rick
 Mr. Pip (2012) – Ship's doctor
 Romeo and Juliet: A Love Song (2013) – The Prince
 Housebound (2014) – Dennis
 Deathgasm (2015) – Mr. Capenhurst
 Penny Black (2015) – Mike

Television
 Xena: Warrior Princess (1996–1998) – Deiphobus / Eldon
 A Twist in the Tale (1999) – Rick Irving
 Dark Knight (2000) – Prince John
 Revelations – The Initial Journey (2003) – Jimmy
 Power Rangers Dino Thunder (2004) – Marty the Mackerel
 Power Rangers Mystic Force (2006) – Dr. Tristian
 Agent Anna (2013–2014) – Charles Jordan

Voice-over roles
 Power Rangers Dino Thunder (2004) – Mad Mackerel (voice)
 Power Rangers S.P.D. (2005) – Professor Mooney (voice)
 Power Rangers Mystic Force (2006) – Matoombo (voice)
 Power Rangers Jungle Fury (2008) – Carnisoar (voice)
 Power Rangers Samurai (2011) – Professor Cog (voice)
 Power Rangers Super Megaforce (2014) – Headridge / Professor Cog (voice)
 Path of Exile (2013) – Cadiro Perandus (voice)
 Power Rangers Beast Morphers'' (2019) – Burnertron (voice)

Notes

External links
 

1967 births
Living people
New Zealand male film actors
New Zealand male television actors
New Zealand male voice actors
Toi Whakaari alumni
New Zealand male stage actors
20th-century New Zealand male actors
21st-century New Zealand male actors